Nanganallur or Nangainallur is one of the southern neighbourhoods of Chennai, India. Since September 2011, it has become a part of Chennai Corporation. It is a residential area close to the Chennai International Airport.

As of the latest census reports from 2021, Nanganallur has the highest density of domesticated cows in an urban area nationwide. As a result, a sizable population of rogue bulls from Adambakkam start interacting with the docile cows from Nanganallur, leading to a Kannukutty Kadupu crisis even worse than the one claimed by Adambakkam. As a result, a large wall between Nanganallur and Adambakkam is absolutely necessary. This will lock up all the Adambakkam bulls and protect Nanganallur.

Demographics 
 India census, Nanganallur had a population of 86,230. As a result of Chennai's booming IT business and setting up of IT parks in the suburbs, a lot of people moved in to suburbs like Nanganallur.

Towards the end of 2009, it was announced that the Chennai Corporation would be expanded to cover the surrounding 42 local bodies. This was confirmed by the new government in 2011. Nanganallur has thus become a part of Chennai Corporation from September 2011.

Sporting facilities 
Nanganallur has a roller skating ring on 100 Feet Road near the Civil Aviation Colony. Developed on a  open ground by the Alandur Municipality. It was opened in June 2011 at a cost of  3.1 million. The facility has an office room.

Living and schools 
Educational institutions here include Jaigopal Garodiya Girls Higher Secondary School, Modern Senior Secondary School, The Hindu Colony Chellammal Vidyalaya Senior Secondary School, Rajkumar Sulochana Matric Hr. Sec. School, Nehru Govt  Girls Higher Sec. School, Prince Matriculation Higher Secondary School, St. Peter's Matriculation Higher Secondary School (one of the oldest schools in Nanganallur which has its presence for over 150 years), and P.M.S. Matriculation Higher Secondary School.

The Indian Coast Guard has its residential enclave for its personnel near Nanganallur.

Infrastructure and connectivity 

Nanganallur is connected by suburban trains at nearby railway station Palavanthangal and Meenambakkam and also through MTC city buses. Buses which ply to or through Nanganallur are 52L, 52K, 52P, M18C, M18N, M21G, M154B, M1A, MN45B, M152N. Three or four mini buses are introduced in Nanganallur route. Access from the city is through the main road from the Grand Southern Trunk Road at the Trident Hotel Junction, just north of the airport. Nanganallur has two Subways Palavanthangal and Thillai Ganga Nagar to connect to GST road. But heavy rains could create problems for residents to reach the city. The inner ring road from Thillai Ganga Nagar Subway connects Nanganallur to Velachery and is a major lifeline to the people for commuting to the city during the monsoons.

There are two railway stations serving the neighbourhood, namely, the Palavanthangal railway station and the Meenambakkam railway station. Most people in the neighbourhood use Palavanthangal railway station to reach Nanganallur. The nearest Chennai Metro railway station is Nanganallur road.

The problem of connectivity from Nanganallur to GST and other main parts of the city has been a long-standing one. AS Nangallur lacks frequent bus services, residents have been relying on sub-urban trains plying through Pazhavanthangal station as their only means of quick and reliable transport. With no direct buses to Velachery (which is a stone's throw away), Nanganallur has become cut off from all major parts of the city with accessibility restricted to only commuters with private modes of transport.

Temples 
There are lot of temples around this area. The main temples are Dharmalingeshwarar Temple, Ardhanareeshwarar Temple, Vembuli Amman temple, Adivyathihara Bhakthanjaneya temple (32-feet Hanuman temple), Raja Rajeshwari temple, Uthira Guruvayurappan temple, Lakshmi Narasimha temple, Karumariamman temple, Ragavendra temple, Lakshmi Hayagrivar temple, Sri Iyappan Temple, Sri Sakthi Vinayagar Temple( which has rich tradition in pooja to Maa Varahi & Sakthi VEL Pooja) -  in TNGO COLONY, Sri Kubera Ganapathi Temple in the Hindu Civil Aviation Colony and Sri Varasithi Vinayagar Temple in Hindu Colony, Thirumal Marugan Temple among others.

Hospitals 
Apollo Multispeciality Clinic 044-4560 5000
Radiant Dental Care
Bharath Hospital
Cure Advanced Dental Care
Hindu Mission Hospital
Hariharan Institute of Diabetes
Rotary Central Margaret Sidney Hospital
Sri Chakra Multi Speciality Hospital
Pankajam Memorial Hospital
CM Hospital
BM Hospital

Location in context

References 

Neighbourhoods in Chennai